Tropical Cyclone Urmil (RSMC Nadi designation: 06F, JTWC designation: 07P) was a short lived storm of January 2006 that explosively intensified to reach its peak intensity as a high-end Category 2 cyclone on the Australian Scale, just 12 hours after being named. Forming out of a tropical disturbance early on January 14, Urmil quickly intensified before weakening just as quickly. The intensification was a result of the main convective banding feature wrapping around the center of circulation. However, the combination of high wind shear and the rapid movement of the cyclone caused convection to become separated from the center. By January 15, the storm transitioned into an extratropical cyclone shortly before dissipating. Urmil had only minor effects on land; scattered vegetation damage was reported in Tonga.

Meteorological history

Tropical Cyclone Urmil originated from a weak tropical disturbance over the open waters of the south Pacific Ocean on January 13. Around 1800 UTC, the Regional Specialized Meteorological Centre (RSMC) in Nadi, Fiji classified the system as Tropical Disturbance 06F, while it was located about 370 km (230 mi) west of Pago Pago, American Samoa. Forming in the wake of Tropical Cyclone Tam, the disturbance rapidly organized within an environment of favorable diffulence aloft, warm waters (29°C; 84.2°F), and moderate wind shear. Six hours later, RSMC Nadi upgraded 06F to a tropical cyclone and gave it the name Urmil while it was situated near Niuatoputapu, Tonga. Shortly after, the Joint Typhoon Warning Center (JTWC) issued a Tropical Cyclone Formation Alert as the storm quickly traveled towards the south-southeast. Around 0600 UTC on January 14, the JTWC classified Urmil as Tropical Cyclone 07P.

During the following six hours, Urmil underwent explosive deepening as the main feeder band wrapped around the center of circulation. After the brief period of intensification, the storm reached its peak intensity with winds of 110 km/h (70 mph) according to both the RSMC Nadi and the JTWC, making it a high-end Category 2 cyclone on the Australian Scale. The highly favorable environment, in combination with the fast forward motion of the storm, allowed Urmil to rapidly reach its peak intensity, despite wind shear reaching 35 km/h (25 mph). However, as quickly as the storm strengthened, it began to weaken as convection weakened. With both wind shear and forward motion increasing, the cyclone quickly became disorganized. Around 0000 UTC on January 15, the center of circulation was devoid of shower and thunderstorm activity. About six hours later, Urmil transitioned into an extratropical cyclone and was subsequently absorbed into the mid-latitude westerlies.

Preparations and impact
Upon being designated Tropical Disturbance 06F, tropical cyclone alerts and strong wind warnings were issued for Niue, Tonga, the Cook Islands, and French Polynesia. A flood advisory and small craft advisory were issued for Samoa. Later that day, the strong wind warnings for the Cook Islands and French Polynesia were canceled, as Urmil no longer posed a threat to the islands. By January 15, all of the warnings associated with Urmil were lifted.

Early on January 14, 06F passed close to Tafahi and Niuatoputapu, produced heavy rains and near gale-force winds over the islands. The highest winds in Tonga were recorded on Niuatoputapu; sustained winds reached 35 km/h (25 mph) with gusts to 65 km/h (40 mph). The winds caused minor damages, mainly limited to vegetation. Some fruit trees were damaged, mainly banana trees. The rains from Urmil exaggerated flooding produced by Cyclone Tam just a few days earlier.

See also

2005–06 South Pacific cyclone season

References

External links

2005–06 South Pacific cyclone season
Tropical cyclones in Tonga
Category 2 South Pacific cyclones
Urmil